Macrotoma serripes is a species of  beetle belonging to the family Cerambycidae.

Description
Main host plants are Albizia adianthifolia, Albizia gummifera, Citrus medica, Cola acuminata, Parkia filicoidea and Sterculia tragacantha.

Distribution
This species can be found in Nigeria, Cameroon, Central Africa, Democratic Republic of the Congo and Angola.

References
 F Vitali Cerambycoidea
 Biolib
 Hallan, J. (2010) Synopsis of the described coleoptera of the world

Prioninae
Beetles described in 1781